Dangerous Tour  is a 1969 Soviet adventure musical film directed by Georgi Yungvald-Khilkevich.

Plot 
The setting of the film is Odessa in the year 1910. A certain Frenchman, Viscount de Cordelia, with the permission of the governor and the "fathers" of the town organizes a cabaret theater. The entertainers who perform there include the singer Bengalsky, a charming dancer, a gypsy duet and of course also a corps de ballet.

However it turns out that this lively place was created by the Bolsheviks. It is a front for the work of a whole group of underground revolutionaries who are under the nose of the enemy with the theater serving as a cover.

Cast
Vladimir Vysotsky as George Bengalsky (Nikolay Kovalenko)
Yefim Kopelyan as Ivan Tarielovich Bobruisky-Dumbadze, police chief 
 Nikolai Grinko as Andrey Maksimovic (Viscount de Cordelia)
 Ivan Pereverzev as Kazimierz Kazimirovich Kulbras, Governor General
 Georgi Yumatov as Maksim
 Kira Muratova as Nina
 Borislav Brondukov as watchman
 S. Krupnin as Ali Baba
 Viktor Pavlovsky
 Vladimir Gulyaev
 Valentin Kulik

Production
Although the film was shot in Odessa and the suburbs, some background shots were shot in Leningrad.

References

External links 

1969 films
1960s musical films
Soviet adventure films
Films set in 1910
Odesa Film Studio films
Vladimir Vysotsky
1969 in the Soviet Union
Films scored by Oleksandr Bilash